Salatis is a Neotropical genus of spread-winged skippers in the family Hesperiidae, in which they are placed to tribe Phocidini.

Species of the genus Salatis are native to Central America and South America, including in the Amazon River basin.

Species
The following species are recognised in the genus Salatis:

Salatis canalis (Skinner, 1920)
Salatis salatis (Stoll, 1782)
Salatis cebrenus (Cramer, 1777)
Salatis flavomarginatus (Sepp, [1851])

References

Natural History Museum Lepidoptera genus database

External links
Images representing Salatis  at Consortium for the Barcode of Life

Eudaminae
Butterflies of Central America
Hesperiidae of South America
Lepidoptera of Brazil
Fauna of the Amazon
Hesperiidae genera